Love Alarm is a South Korean streaming television series starring Kim So-hyun, Jung Ga-ram, and Song Kang. Based on the Daum webtoon of the same name by Chon Kye-young, it follows the life of a high school girl in a society greatly influenced by a mobile app capable of notifying whether someone within their vicinity has romantic feelings for them.

Love Alarm is the first Korean series confirmed for pick-up by Netflix. The first season of the series premiered on Netflix on August 22, 2019. It was ranked as one of Netflix's top releases and was renewed for a second season in October 2019; season 2 was released on March 12, 2021. In 2021, the series managed to rank as the 6th most watched K-dramas worldwide in the platform. In 2022, it is the 9th most searched Korean drama worldwide.

Synopsis
Love Alarm revolves around the story of a technology that enables users to discover love through an application which notifies users when someone within 10 meters has romantic feelings for them.

Cast

Main
 Kim So-hyun as Kim Jo-jo, a beautiful and hardworking high school student who is bright and cheerful despite her family's painful history.
 Jung Ga-ram as Lee Hye-yeong, a hardworking high school student who also likes Jo-jo and is the childhood friend of Sun-Oh. He is the only child of a domestic helper working at Sun-oh's house.
 Song Kang as Hwang Sun-oh, a handsome model and high school student who grew up as an only child in a rich, but uncaring family with lots of problems. He falls in love with Kim Jo-jo.

Recurring

 Go Min-si as Park Gul-mi, Jo-jo's selfish, egotistic cousin. She is a popular girl at school who likes Sun-oh but is asked out by Cheon Duk-gu, developing hatred for him. She also became jealous of Jo-jo at one point. She gradually matures and becomes more empathetic in the latter half of Season 2.
 Lee Jae-eung as Cheon Duk-gu, developer of the Love Alarm application.
 Song Seon-mi as Jeong Mi-mi, a popular actress who has a distant relationship with her son Sun-oh.
 Shim Yi-young as Bae Kyung-hee, Hye-yeong's loving and caring mother.
 Kim Young-pil as Hwang Jae-cheol
 Park Sung-yeon as Jojo's aunt and Gul-mi's mother.
 Yoon Na-moo as Kim Min-jae
 Shin Seung-ho as Jang Il-sik, a vibrant judo student and Jo-jo's ex-boyfriend.
 Ji Hye-ra as Kim Jang-go, Jo-jo's best friend. She secretly likes Il-sik. She and Jo-jo eventually drift apart.
 Kim Ye-ji as Sung Ji-yeon
 Kim Young-ok as Jo-jo's grandmother.
 Choi Joo-won as Choi Joo-won, Sun-oh's playful and energetic high school classmate.
 Yeom Ji-young as Jo-jo's mother.
 Song Geon-hee as Marx, a popular idol star.
 Kim Si-eun as Lee Yuk-jo, Sun-Oh's new girlfriend.
 Jo Yoo-jung as Mon Sun, Jo-jo's wedding hall co-worker.
 Bae Da-bin as Lee Wei-ju, Jo-jo's best friend
 Yoo In-soo as Student
 Ham Sung-min as Bullied student	
 Bigman as OST Singer (Cameo; Season 1 episode 5)
 Ki Do-hoon as Brian Cheon, developer of Love Alarm (Season 2) 
 Yoon Dong-hwan as Lee Gang-rae, Hye-yeong's father who was serving life imprisonment for murder and currently pending a review for parole. (Cameo; Season 2 episode 2)

Episodes

Series overview

Season 1 (2019)

Season 2 (2021)

Production

In January 2017, Netflix collaborated with Hidden Sequence to produce their first South Korean original series for the platform based on the eponymous Daum webtoon by Chon Kye-young. The series was planned to be released in 2018 but the premiere date was postponed to 2019 because of the delay in production for internal reasons, as reported by Korea JoongAng Daily. On September 4, 2018, Netflix announced that Love Alarm would now be produced by Studio Dragon, with Lee Ah-youn and Seo Bo-ra (Coffee, Do Me a Favor) writing the screenplay and Lee Na-jeong (Fight for My Way) directing. Kim So-hyun, Jung Ga-ram and Song Kang were cast for main roles; Song Kang was selected through audition competing with 900 people. First season with eight episodes was released on August 22, 2019.

In October 2019, Love Alarm was renewed for a second follow-up season. The first script reading for season 2 took place on February 21, 2020. On February 14, 2021, Netflix announced that season 2 would be released on March 12, 2021 and it would be written by Cha Yeon-soo and Kim Seo-hee, with Kim Jin-woo (Suits) directing and Ryu Bo-ra (Snowy Road, Secret Love) participating as script producer. Production H, which already collaborated with Studio Dragon in 2018 to produce Life on Mars, joined as a co-producer for the second season.

Soundtrack

The soundtrack of Love Alarm includes seven songs and fourteen musical scores; it was released through several music portals on September 6, 2019. Vocals were performed by Tearliner, Klang and Hodge.

Instead of Studio Dragon's sister company Stone Music Entertainment (which had the distribution rights to soundtracks of most Studio Dragon-produced dramas), indie music distributor Biscuit Sound handled the distribution rights for the soundtrack.

Promotion
Love Alarm held an interactive experience zone from August 18 to September 1, 2019 at Lotte World Tower World Park Square. Each space was decorated as if the app function in the drama is visualized in reality and gave a romantic experience to lovers, friends, and family who visited the place. Also, an app that looks like the one in the series (but works differently) was released for the promotional events.

Reception

Season 1
On December 30, 2019, Netflix unveiled the 10 most loved shows in South Korea in 2019, in which the series was ranked eighth. Forbes Joan MacDonald said that Love Alarm gives the familiar romance drama "a fresh twist" by introducing a mobile app and found that "Kim So-hyun is well cast as Jo-jo". Maggie Adan of Cosmopolitan Philippines wrote that she "initially found the motivations of the characters a little irrational and [shallow] ... but afterlooking back on [her] teenage years and recalling that [she] was prone to blowing things out of proportion and being melodramatic about love and relationships at that age, too, [she] realised that the show is actually more truthful than [she] give it credit for ... it just doesn't resonate with [her] anymore" Stephen McCarty from the South China Morning Post opined that "Love Alarm is not only an innocent love story but also deals with data protection, gay rights, the extreme consequences of heartache, and smartphone invasion."

Cinema Escapist Richard Yu commends Love Alarm for being a social commentary on the negative influence of social media in today's society. He posits:

Season 2
Season 2 of Love Alarm primarily received negative to mixed reviews from the critics. Pierce Conran of South China Morning Post gave a rating of 2 out of 5 and said, "There is even less meat to the story than first time around, and some jarring secondary plot lines that try to mix in social commentary are distracting." Greg Wheeler of The Review Geek gave a rating of 5 out of 10 and said, "Ultimately though Love Alarm serves up a lukewarm offering that's going to feel colder for fans expecting a red-hot follow-up to what's come before. If you can go in with no expectations, Love Alarm certainly has enough to enjoy, but there's equally nothing here that really stands out. This follow-up uses all the K-drama tricks in the book and does so with very little aplomb. This is one alarm that's very unlikely to ring for a third season." However, the series was generally well-received as it managed to rank as the 6th most watched Korean drama worldwide in Netflix in 2021.

Awards and nominations

Notes

References

External links
 
 Love Alarm (season 1) at Studio Dragon 
 Love Alarm (season 2) at Studio Dragon 
 Love Alarm (original webtoon) at Daum 
 
  (season 1)
  (season 2)

2010s South Korean television series
2020s South Korean television series
2019 South Korean television series debuts
South Korean pre-produced television series
Korean-language Netflix original programming
Television shows based on South Korean webtoons
Television series by Studio Dragon
South Korean romance television series
South Korean high school television series
Television series about teenagers
Television series about social media
Social reputation in fiction
Works about mobile phones